The Crystal Simorgh is an award given by Fajr International Film Festival, Iran's major annual film festival. It is awarded in several categories of International Competition as well as Iranian Cinema Competition. The award's name comes from the Simurgh, a mythical bird that appears in Persian mythology.

The Crystal Simorgh is one of the highest film honors in Iran.

See also
Simurgh
:Category:Crystal Simorgh recipients

References

 
Fajr International Film Festival
Iranian film awards